The third competition weekend of the 2013–14 ISU Speed Skating World Cup was held in the Alau Ice Palace in Astana, Kazakhstan, from Friday, 29 November, until Sunday, 1 December 2013. It was previously announced to be in Heerenveen, Netherlands.

There were no new world records this weekend, but Lee Sang-hwa of South Korea set a new low-altitude record on the women's 500 metres on Friday, as she skated the fastest time recorded on any rink outside Calgary and Salt Lake City, continuing her winning streak from the start of the season through Saturday's race. Shani Davis of the United States and Sven Kramer of the Netherlands also continued their unbeaten streaks, on the men's 1000 metres and 5000/10000 meters, respectively.

Schedule
The detailed schedule of events:

All times are BTT (UTC+6).

Medal summary

Men's events

Women's events

Standings
The top ten standings in the contested cups after the weekend.

Men's cups
500 m

1000 m

1500 m

5000/10000 m

Grand World Cup

Women's cups
500 m

1000 m

1500 m

3000/5000 m

Grand World Cup

References

 
3
Isu World Cup, 2013-14, 3
Sport in Astana